Roy Heiner (born 22 November 1960, in Virginia, Free State, South Africa) is a sailor from the Netherlands, who represented his country at the 1988 Summer Olympics in Pusan. Heiner took 7th place in the Finn. In 1992 Summer Olympics, Barcelona Heiner helmed the Dutch Soling. With crew members Peter Burggraaff and Han Bergsma Heiner took 18th place. Heiner switched back to the Finn for the 1996 Summer Olympics, Savannah and took the bronze medal. His last Olympic appearance was in the 2000 Sydney Olympics. With crew members Peter van Niekerk and Dirk de Ridder Heiner took 4th place in the Soling.

Sailing career
Besides his Olympic sailing career Heiner competed on professional basis in:
 Three years in the World Matchrace circuit
 Three Volvo Ocean Races,
 Skipper of Brunel Sunergy (1997–1998)
 Skipper of Assa Abloy (2002) for the first leg (sacked in Cape Town)
 Technical Director of the winning Team ABN AMRO campaign (2005–2006)
 BMW Oracle (America's Cup 2003) in new Zealand as:
 Training boat helmsman
 Afterguard coach of the racing team

Professional life
Heiner holds a BSc in Civil Engineering from the University of Durban-Westville (1980–1985). In 1996 Heiner founded his Sailing academy: Team Heiner nowadays located in Lelystad.

References

Further reading

External links
 
 
 

1960 births
Living people
People from Matjhabeng Local Municipality
Dutch male sailors (sport)
Sailors at the 1988 Summer Olympics – Finn
Sailors at the 1992 Summer Olympics – Soling
Sailors at the 1996 Summer Olympics – Finn
Sailors at the 2000 Summer Olympics – Soling
Olympic sailors of the Netherlands
Olympic medalists in sailing
Olympic bronze medalists for the Netherlands
Volvo Ocean Race sailors
Medalists at the 1996 Summer Olympics
Oracle Racing sailors
2003 America's Cup sailors
European Champions Soling